The women's doubles tournament in tennis at the 2007 Pan American Games was played from July 18 to July 22.  Jorgelina Cravero and Betina Jozami of Argentina were the champions.

Medals

Seeds

  (champions, gold medal)
  (quarterfinals)
  (semifinals, bronze medal)
  (quarterfinals)

Draw

References
Sports123.com

Women's doubles